Marina Erakovic and Elena Vesnina were the defending champions but decided not to participate.
Anna-Lena Grönefeld and Květa Peschke won the title, defeating Julia Görges and Barbora Záhlavová-Strýcová in the final, 6–3, 6–4

Seeds

Draw

Draw

References
 Main Draw

Generali Ladies Linz - Doubles